John Treffry (1594–1658) was an English politician who sat in the House of Commons from 1621 to 1622.

Treffry was the son of William Treffry of Cornwall and was baptised at Fowey on 26 January 1594. He matriculated at Exeter College, Oxford on 14 June 1611 aged 16. In 1621, he was elected Member of Parliament for Fowey.

Treffry died at the age of about 64 and was buried at Fowey on 24 September 1658.

References

1594 births
1658 deaths
Members of the pre-1707 English Parliament for constituencies in Cornwall
Alumni of Exeter College, Oxford
People from Fowey
English MPs 1621–1622